Lu Jianying (1776 – 19 March 1853) was the Viceroy of Liangjiang from early 1849 until early 1853. When the Taiping Rebellion army occupied Nanjing on 19 March, Lu Jianying was killed by the Taiping. Lu was the second to be killed (the first was the Viceroy of Huguang in early 1853) and a few of the highest rank governors killed in action in the Qing dynasty. When Beijing knew of Lu's death and the loss of Nanjing, they chose to impeach Lu in order to place the blame on him, saying he was incapable of commanding the battle.

Sources 
Draft History of Qing

Battle of Nanjing (1853)

1776 births
1853 deaths
Qing military personnel killed in action
Qing dynasty politicians from Hubei
People of the Taiping Rebellion
Politicians from Xiantao
Political office-holders in Jiangsu
Political office-holders in Yunnan
Viceroys of Liangjiang